Feralpisalò is an Italian association football club located in Salò, Lombardy, and representing also the nearby town of Lonato del Garda, Lombardy.

The club currently play in Serie C, the third tier of Italian football.

History
The club was founded in summer 2009, from the merger between two clubs, both of Serie D:
 A.C. Salò of Salò, founded in 1985, as A.C. Salò Benaco and so renamed since 2001,
 A.C. Feralpi Lonato of Lonato del Garda, founded in 1980, as A.C. Lonato and so renamed since 1985.

On 12 August 2009 the club was admitted to Lega Pro Seconda Divisione in place of not admitted Pistoiese.

In the season 2010–11 from Lega Pro Seconda Divisione group A,  the club gained  promotion to Lega Pro Prima Divisione via the playoffs, for the first time ever.

Colours and badge

Its colours are blue and green: representing Salò and Feralpi Lonato.

Current squad

Out on loan

References

External links
 Official homepage

Football clubs in Italy
Association football clubs established in 2009
Football clubs in Lombardy
Serie C clubs
2009 establishments in Italy